Dean and Dan Caten (né Catenacci; born December 19, 1964) are Canadian fashion designers, radio personalities, and businessmen. They are identical twin brothers and the founders and owners of Dsquared², an Italian luxury fashion house based in Milan.

Early life 

Dean and Dan Caten were born in 1964 in Toronto, Ontario and grew up in Willowdale. They have seven older siblings. Their father is from Casalvieri, a small town in Ciociaria, Lazio, Italy. In 1983, they moved to New York to study fashion at Parsons School of Design, but stayed for only one semester before returning to Toronto.

Finding a financial backer in 1986, they launched their first signature womenswear collection, DEanDAN. By 1988 they had signed on to label Ports International (currently Ports 1961) as creative directors. At the same time, the Catens designed for their lower-end, leisure brand, Tabi International. In 1991, the brothers moved to Milan, Italy where they worked as designers for the house of Gianni Versace, and denim brand Diesel, the latter of which funded and launched their namesake brand. They debuted their men's collection in 1994, and in 2003, they launched a women's collection and a men's underwear collection.

Career

Dsquared² 

The Dsquared² brand was launched in 1995.

In 2000–01, Madonna commissioned the brothers to design over 150 pieces for her Drowned World Tour 2001 and "Don't Tell Me" music video.

A runway show in 2005 ended with Christina Aguilera stripping male models of their clothes. In September 2007, the Dsquared² fashion show in Milan featured Rihanna entering the stage in an American muscle car, followed by a runway walk. In January 2010, the Dsquared² Autumn/Winter 2010 menswear show in Milan featured Bill Kaulitz descending from the ceiling in a caged elevator à la Rocky Horror Picture Show. Bill Kaulitz opened and closed the Dsquared² Autumn/Winter 2010 menswear show in Milan.

In June 2007, the first Dsquared² flagship was opened in Milan's fashion district. Stores also opened in St. Moritz, Athens, Mykonos, Capri, Istanbul, Kyiv, Cannes, Singapore, Paris, Nicosia and Hong Kong. In March 2015, Dsquared² opened their first flagship store in London. This is the first stage of their major store redesign programme that will continue into the US at the end of 2015. More recent Dsquared² stores openings have included Miami, Doha, Los Angeles, New York, Baku, Rome, Istanbul, Prague and Madrid.

In 2013, the Dsquared² brand had a brand turnover of about €200 million. The brand generates most of its revenues through licensing deals.

The brothers stage elaborate fashion shows to showcase their men's and women's apparel, footwear, fragrances, and cosmetics. The brand's slogan is "Born in Canada, living in London, made in Italy".

Their designs have been worn by Britney Spears (2009 world tour The Circus Starring Britney Spears and Tokio Hotel's Welcome to Humanoid City tour), Madonna, Tokio Hotel's lead singer Bill Kaulitz, Justin Timberlake, Kendrick Lamar, Ricky Martin, Nicolas Cage, Lenny Kravitz, Fergie in the music video "Clumsy" and The Black Eyed Peas' "I Gotta Feeling".

TV/Radio 

The Caten brothers host their own radio program called Dean and Dan on Air: Style in Stereo. The show began airing on Sirius XM satellite radio's BPM channel and features a variety of music (including soundtracks from select Dsquared² runway shows), along with celebrity interviews, fashion and political discussions.

Other projects 

The twins have worked on side projects; they have appeared on America's Next Top Model and co-hosted their own show Launch My Line.

In 2006, the brothers were selected to design the new official uniforms for football team Juventus. In March 2008, the Catens signed an agreement to design sunglasses with Marcolin, an Italian sunglasses and eyeglasses manufacturer. In May 11, 2021 they signed an agreement with Safilo Group S.p.A.

Marketing

Chris Brown wore a Dsquared² hoodie in his video for his 2017 song "To My Bed".

Controversy 

The brothers attended the 2013 Hallowood "Disco Africa" fashion industry party in Milan in racially insensitive costumes. From the décolletage up they appeared as white drag queens with oversized blonde wigs, with their bodies painted brown and adorned in "tribal" costume.

Following the unveiling of its "DSquaw" line at the 2015 Milan Fashion Week, critics expressed outrage at the fashion studio's use of the term "Squaw", a word which carries strongly racist connotations as a derogatory term for North American indigenous women. Critics furthermore pointed to the appropriation of Inuu and Canadian indigenous decorations and attire in the fashion line itself, calling it a "misappropriation". All instances of "DSquaw" were later taken down from official Dsquared² media and marketing channels.

Awards and honors
 2003 - GQ Men of the Year Breakout Design Award
 2006 - Golden Needle Award
 2009 - Attribution of a star on Canada's Walk of Fame in Toronto.
 2017 - Awarded honorary citizenship of Casalvieri  and the first edition of LeColuche prize.

References

External links
 Dsquared² official website
 Dsquared² history
 
 Dsquared² talk about their work and life in Milan

1964 births
Living people
Businesspeople from Toronto
Canadian businesspeople in fashion
Canadian expatriates in England
Canadian fashion designers
Canadian people of Italian descent
Canadian radio personalities
Canadian retail chief executives
Clothing brands of Canada
Clothing companies of Canada
Fashion accessory brands
High fashion brands
Identical twins
20th-century Canadian LGBT people
LGBT fashion designers
Luxury brands
People from Willowdale, Toronto
Sibling duos
Canadian twins
21st-century Canadian LGBT people